Chris Guccione and Matt Reid were the defending champions, but decided not to play together. Chris Guccione will play alongside Samuel Groth.

Samuel Groth and Chris Guccione won the title, defeating Marcus Daniell and Artem Sitak in the final, 6–3, 6–4.

Seeds

Draw

Draw

References
 Main Draw

Challenger Ficrea - Doubles
2013 Doubles